Jafarabad (also Romanized as Ja‘farābād) is a village in Siyavashan Rural District, in the Central District of Ashtian County, Markazi Province, Iran. At the 2006 census, its population was 160, in 58 families.

References 

Populated places in Ashtian County